Jonathan Harkness (born 18 November 1985) is a Northern Irish footballer who plays as a left fullback for Donegal Celtic. Harkness is a former Northern Ireland youth international and he had spells with Walsall and Cambridge United.

Harkness played as a teenager for Linfield making his debut at 16, eventually returning to the club when he was 22 from Kidderminster Harriers in 2008. In July 2010 he signed a one-year deal for Coleraine, and made his debut on 7 August 2010. After his one-year contract expired he was then signed by Donegal Celtic and made his debut for them on 6 August 2011.

References

External links

1985 births
Cambridge United F.C. players
Association football defenders
Kidderminster Harriers F.C. players
Living people
Association footballers from Northern Ireland
People from Antrim, County Antrim
Walsall F.C. players
Linfield F.C. players
Donegal Celtic F.C. players